Kattur also known as Kattoor is a suburb north of Chennai, a metropolitan city in Tamil Nadu, India.

Administration
It is a revenue village and a part of Kattur village panchayat in Minjur block. It is administered by Ponneri taluk of Tiruvallur district.

Location
Kattur is located in between Pazhaverkadu and Minjur in North of Chennai. The arterial road in Kattur is Minjur - Pazhaverkadu road.

References

External links 
 

Neighbourhoods in Chennai